Seo Bo-min (born 22 June 1990) is a South Korean footballer who plays as midfielder for Seoul E-Land FC in K League 2.

Career
He signed with Gangwon FC on 13 December 2013.

On 4th March 2022, he joined Seoul E-Land FC.

References

External links 

1990 births
Living people
Association football midfielders
South Korean footballers
Gangwon FC players
Pohang Steelers players
Seongnam FC players
Seoul E-Land FC players
K League 2 players
K League 1 players